The Rides are an American blues supergroup, featuring guitarists Stephen Stills, Kenny Wayne Shepherd and keyboardist Barry Goldberg. The group formed in 2013 following a performance by the trio at a benefit led by Stills. Stills called the band “the blues band of my dreams”. The band toured in support of their debut album Can't Get Enough in the fall of 2013 backed by bassist Kevin McCormick (who played with  Crosby, Stills and Nash in 2012) and Shepherd's longtime drummer Chris Layton. Their second album Pierced Arrow followed in 2016, it peaked at number one in the Billboard Top Blues Albums Chart.

Band members
Main members
 Stephen Stills - guitar, vocals
 Kenny Wayne Shepherd - guitar, vocals
 Barry Goldberg - keyboards
Touring musicians
 Kevin McCormick - bass
 Chris Layton - drums

Discography

Studio albums

References

American blues musical groups
Blues music supergroups
429 Records artists
Musical groups established in 2013
2013 establishments in the United States
Provogue Records artists